Floyd Edwin Yount (December 19, 1915 – October 26, 1973) was a professional baseball player. He played six games in two seasons in Major League Baseball, four for the Philadelphia Athletics in 1937 and two for the Pittsburgh Pirates in 1939, primarily as an outfielder. Yount enjoyed a minor league career which lasted until 1951, except for three seasons missed during World War II.

External links

Major League Baseball outfielders
Philadelphia Athletics players
Pittsburgh Pirates players
Williamsport Grays players
Oakland Oaks (baseball) players
Portsmouth Cubs players
Little Rock Travelers players
Oklahoma City Indians players
Syracuse Chiefs players
Toronto Maple Leafs (International League) players
Hamilton Red Wings (baseball) players
Buffalo Bisons (minor league) players
Newton-Conover Twins players
Baseball players from North Carolina
1915 births
1973 deaths
People from Newton, North Carolina
Mooresville Moors players